Zane Taylor (born April 23, 1988) is a former American football center. He went undrafted in the 2011 NFL Draft but was signed by the New York Jets and released following the preseason. He also spent time on the Tampa Bay Buccaneers, Indianapolis Colts and Philadelphia Eagles. He played college football at Utah.

Early years
Taylor grew up in Moab, Utah.  He was a multi-sport star and led Grand County High School to its first state football championship.

College career
Taylor played college football as the starting center for the University of Utah Utes football team from 2008 to 2010.  In August 2009, a feature story written by Taylor about summer football workouts was published by The Wall Street Journal.  He was a second-team All-MWC selection as a junior, and a first-team honoree as a senior. As a senior, he was also selected for the Outland Trophy watchlist, and as a finalist for the 2010 Lowe's Senior CLASS Award, awarded to a student-athlete for excellence in community, classroom, character and competition.

Professional career

New York Jets
Although he went undrafted in the NFL draft, Taylor impressed scouts at Utah's Pro Day and at the NFL scouting combine.  In August 2011, he signed a contract to play professional football for the New York Jets.  On September 3, the Jets released Taylor.

Tampa Bay Buccaneers
Taylor was signed to the practice squad on September 28, 2011 but was later released.

Philadelphia Eagles
The Philadelphia Eagles signed Taylor to their practice squad on November 23, 2011. At the conclusion of the 2011 season, his practice squad contract expired and he became a free agent. He was re-signed to the active roster on January 2, 2012. He was waived on May 17, 2012.

Indianapolis Colts
Taylor was claimed by the Indianapolis Colts on waivers, on May 18, 2012. Following the 2012 preseason Taylor was released by the Colts.

References

External links
Philadelphia Eagles bio
Tampa Bay Buccaneers bio
New York Jets bio
Utah Utes bio

1988 births
Living people
Players of American football from Utah
American football offensive guards
American football centers
Utah Utes football players
Tampa Bay Buccaneers players
New York Jets players
Philadelphia Eagles players
Indianapolis Colts players
People from Murray, Utah
People from Moab, Utah